James Thomas Milton Anderson (July 23, 1878 – December 29, 1946) was the fifth premier of Saskatchewan and the first Conservative to hold the office.

Early career
Anderson was chosen as leader of the Conservatives in 1924 and was one of the party's three Members of the Legislative Assembly elected in the 1925 election.

Premiership
In the 1929 election, the Conservatives were able to exploit patronage scandals surrounding the Liberal government of Saskatchewan Premier James Garfield Gardiner to achieve a major breakthrough by winning 24 seats. The Liberals won 28 seats, with 5 going to the Progressive Party and the remaining 4 to independents. The Liberals tried to form a minority government but were defeated in a motion of no confidence, which allowed Anderson to form a co-operative government, a coalition between the Conservatives, Progressives and Independents.

Anderson was accused of working closely with the Ku Klux Klan, which was a major force in the province in the late 1920s and the early 1930s with an estimated 25,000 members. Pat Emmons, a senior Klan defector, alleged that Anderson and Klan officials regularly met, and the Liberals accused the Conservatives of being a front for the Klan. With few Blacks in the province, and First Nations largely confined to Indian reserves under the informal pass system, the focus of the Klan was against immigration, Catholics, and francophones; as well as opposition to the Gardiner Liberals, who were seen as supporting all three of those groups.

Anderson denied the allegations, but upon gaining power, he took the portfolio of Minister of Education while he was premier and proposed amendments to the Schools Act to ban the instruction of French in public schools and to outlaw the display of religious symbols in all schools, including the Catholic separate school system. The Klan supported those changes and worked hard to elect and defend the Conservative-dominated government.

Loss of office
The Anderson government also had to face the onset of the Great Depression and the Dust Bowl, which destroyed the province's agrarian economy. Anderson also had to deal with labour unrest culminating in the Estevan Riot of 1931. The government formed the Saskatchewan Relief Commission to try to help those affected by the drought and massive unemployment. Those efforts were insufficient, and in the 1934 elections, the Conservatives lost every seat in the legislature and remained a minor party for 40 years.

Electoral history

Saskatchewan general elections, 1925 to 1934 

Anderson led the Conservative Party in three general elections, in 1925, 1929 and 1934.  They came in third in seats in 1925, formed a minority government in 1929, and were completely eliminated from the Assembly in the 1934 election.

1925 General election 

In his first general election, Anderson and the Conservatives came in third, although he managed to win a seat in the Legislative Assembly.

1 Premier when election was called;  Premier after the election.
2 Co-Leaders of the Opposition after the election.

1929 General election 

Anderson led the Conservatives to a much improved result in the 1929 election, being only eight seats short of a majority in a hung parliament. Premier Gardiner and the Liberals had four more seats than the Conservatives.  Gardiner chose to face the Assembly in hopes of obtaining sufficient support from some of the opposition members to maintain his government.  Anderson organized a vote on a confidence motion which defeated the government.  Gardiner resigned and Anderson became Premier.

1 Premier when election was called;  lost confidence motion in the Assembly after the election;  resigned as Premier and became Leader of the Opposition.
2 Co-Leader of the Opposition when the election was called; became Premier after successful vote of non-confidence in the Gardiner government.

1934 General election 

Anderson was Premier for almost five years and led the Conservatives into the 1934 election, at the depths of the Great Depression and Dirty Thirties.  The Conservatives were routed, losing every seat, although they came in second in the popular vote.  The Liberals under Gardiner won a massive majority, with all but five seats in the Legislative Assembly.  The Farmer-Labour Party formed the Opposition.

1 Leader of the Opposition when election was called;  Premier after the election.
2 Party leader during the election, but failed to win seat;  role as Leader of the Opposition taken by George Hara Williams.
3 Premier when election was called;  lost seat in the election and resigned as Premier.

Saskatchewan constituency elections 

Anderson stood for election five times, all in the riding of Saskatoon City, which returned two members.  After becoming Premier after the 1929 general election, he was required by the electoral law at that time to be re-elected in a by-election, which he won by acclamation.  He won two contested elections and lost two.

1925 General election:  Saskatoon City 

E Elected.
X Incumbent.
1 Rounding error.

1929 General election:  Saskatoon City 

E Elected.
X Incumbent.

1929 By-election:  Saskatoon City 

E Elected.
X Incumbent.

1934 General election:  Saskatoon City 

E Elected.
X Incumbent.
1 Rounding error.

1938 General election:  Saskatoon City 

E Elected.
X Incumbent.

References

Sources
Encyclopedia of Saskatchewan
The Canadian Encyclopedia
Saskatchewan Archives Board – Saskatchewan Election Results By Electoral Division

1878 births
1946 deaths
Canadian Anglicans
Premiers of Saskatchewan
Saskatchewan political party leaders
Progressive Conservative Party of Saskatchewan MLAs